Antonio Arias Suñé (c. 1847 – 4 July 1913) was the mayor of Ponce, Puerto Rico from 1903 to 1904.

Biography
Arias Suñé was born in Ponce around 1847. His parents were José María Arias Tellechea, from Venezuela, and Mercedes Suñé. He married Rosalía Ríos Ovalle, with whom he had seven children: Jose Maria, Rodulfo, Angel, Teodoro, Rosa Maria, Rafael, and Carlos Juan. Arias Suñé died on 4 July 1913.

Mayoral term
Due to a new law that had been passed in the Puerto Rico Legislature the previous year (1902), which annexed the municipality of Guayanilla to the municipality of Ponce, mayor Arias Suñé was, in effect, the mayor of Guayanilla as well, during his one-year term as mayor of Ponce. Once no longer mayor of Ponce, Arias returned to Guayanilla to oversee that municipality in the unofficial post as Guayanilla's mayor. The law was repealed in 1905, after which Guayanilla elected its own mayor again. Arias Suñé resigned his post on 23 June 1904.  Among public works legacy of mayor Arias is the "town hall" of Barrio Playa, built on the northeast corner of Calle Padre Noel (then Calle Virtud) and Calle Alfonso XII. The building cost $4,253.48, plus $400 for the lot, both in 1903 dollars. The structure was used for barrio offices of sanitation, police, and firemen.

See also

 List of Puerto Ricans
 List of mayors of Ponce, Puerto Rico

References

Further reading
 Fay Fowlie de Flores. Ponce, Perla del Sur: Una Bibliográfica Anotada. Second Edition. 1997. Ponce, Puerto Rico: Universidad de Puerto Rico en Ponce. p. 319. Item 1600. 
 Reglamento para el cuerpo de la policía municipal de Ponce, tal como resulta de las ordenanzas números 104 y 136 del Consejo Municipal de dicha ciudad, aprobada por el alcalde [Antonio Arias (José Lloréns Echevarría, secretario)] en 9 de mayo de 1903. Ponce, Puerto Rico: Tipografía Baldorioty, 1903. (Universidad de Puerto Rico, Rio Piedras) 
 Fay Fowlie de Flores. Ponce, Perla del Sur: Una Bibliográfica Anotada. Second Edition. 1997. Ponce, Puerto Rico: Universidad de Puerto Rico en Ponce. p. 332. Item 1655. 
 Ponce. Oficina del Alcalde. Al pueblo de Ponce y el Hon. Gobernador de Puerto Rico. Tipografía Baldorioty. 1902–1906. (Universidad de Puerto Rico - Rio Piedras.)

Mayors of Ponce, Puerto Rico
Year of birth uncertain
1840s births
1913 deaths